The 2010-11 Liga Femenina de Baloncesto was the 48th edition of the Spanish premier women's basketball championship. It took place from 10 October 2010 to 28 April 2011. Fourteen teams took part in the championship, with UNB Obenasa Lacturale and Extrugasa replacing relegated teams CB Estudiantes and Real Canoe.

Perfumerías Avenida won its second title, ending Ros Casares Valencia' four-year winning streak. The Salmantine team also won the Euroleague. Mann Filter Zaragoza and Copa de la Reina champion Rivas Ecópolis also qualified for the play-offs, while Unión Navarra and CB Olesa were relegated. However, the Navarre team was spared from relegation in July as Extrugasa renounced its spot due to financial stress.

Regular season

Championship Playoffs

Semifinals

Final

References

Liga Femenina de Baloncesto seasons
Femenina
Spain
Liga